Dongcheon Station is the name of several metro stations in South Korea.

 Dongcheon Station (Yongin)
 Dongcheon Station (Daegu)